Kotara railway station is located on the Main Northern line in New South Wales, Australia. It serves the southern Newcastle suburb of Kotara, opening on 12 November 1924.

Despite being located in the same suburb, the station is a significant distance from the busy Westfield Kotara and Kotara Home Homemakers Centre, and although these busy locations are alongside the railway line, there is no station there.

Blackbutt Reserve is located 400m north of the station and is a popular destination for locals, but there is no pedestrian access from the station to the reserve, limiting any potential use for the station, and as a result, the station gets low patronage (averaging just 40 passengers a day in 2013).

Platforms and services
Kotara has one island platform with two faces. It is serviced by NSW TrainLink Central Coast & Newcastle Line services travelling from Sydney Central to Newcastle.

See also 

 Tickhole Tunnel

References

External links

Kotara station details Transport for New South Wales

Railway stations in Australia opened in 1924
Railway stations in the Hunter Region
Regional railway stations in New South Wales
Short-platform railway stations in New South Wales, 4 cars
Main North railway line, New South Wales